John Kuo Wei Tchen, also known as Jack, is a historian of Chinese American history and the Inaugural Clement A. Price Chair in Public History and Humanities at Rutgers University.

Biography 
Tchen received his B.A. at the University of Wisconsin–Madison in 1973. He did his M.A. at New York University in 1987 and finished his Ph.D. at NYU in 1992. He was the founding director of the A/P/A Studies Program and Institute at New York University. In 1979-1980, Tchen co-founded the Museum of Chinese in America and continues to serve as its senior advisor. In 2018, Tchen was named the Inaugural Clement A. Price Chair in Public History and the Humanities at Rutgers University and became Director of the Clement Price Institute on Ethnicity, Culture & the Modern Experience.

He received several awards during his academic career: the Charles S. Frankel Prize from the National Endowment for the Humanities(1991), and MLK Humanitarian Award from NYU (2012). His monograph, New York Before Chinatown, was the winner of the History/Social Science Book Award from the Association of Asian American Studies in 2001.

He was featured in the film 9-Man (documentary) and is a frequently called-upon expert on Chinatown and Asian American topics.

Works 

 Tchen, John Kuo Wei and Dylan Yeats (2014). Yellow Peril! An Archive of Anti-Asian Fear. New York: Verso.
 Tchen, John Kuo Wei (1999). New York Before Chinatown: Orientalism and the Shaping of American Culture, 1776-1882. Baltimore, MD: Johns Hopkins University Press. 
 Genthe, Arnold and John Kuo Wei Tchen (1984). Genthe's Photographs of San Francisco's Old Chinatown. New York: Dover Publications.

References

External links 

 Official website

Year of birth unknown
Date of death unknown
University of Wisconsin–Madison alumni
New York University alumni
New York University faculty
American academics of Asian descent
American male writers
American Book Award winners